Biagio Cusano (died Naples, 11 January 1683) was an Italian Marinist poet and professor of law. The date of his birth is currently unknown. He is best known for being Gennaro Cusano's uncle and Marcello Papiniano Cusani's grand uncle.

He came from Vitulano, in Principato Ultra, Kingdom of Naples. He became professor of canon law, Cattedra primaria de' Canoni della mattina, after Giuseppe Pulcarelli was promoted to Giulio Capone's position in 1673 (right after Giulio Capone's death). He apparently died of apoplexy (stroke) in 1683. He wrote many works, both published and unpublished.

Works

See also 
 Marcello Papiniano Cusani

References

Bibliography

External links 
 
 
 Lirici marinisti (1910) – Biagio Cusano

Italian male poets
Marinism
Year of birth missing
1683 deaths
17th-century Italian poets
17th-century Italian male writers
People from the Province of Benevento
Baroque writers